Ben Wharton is an English semi-professional footballer. He plays as striker for Bury AFC. He played one minute in the English Football League for Rochdale.

Early career and Football League appearance
He started out at Stockport County's youth academy and came through the ranks. After he was released at the age of 16 by Stockport he signed a YTS for Rochdale. He came off the bench against Accrington Stanley, in the 90th minute, to make his debut. Wharton didn't play another minute for the club that season and was released at the end of the 2007-08 season.

Non-league football career

Mossley
He then made two appearances for Mossley, both as substitute.

Northwich Victoria
He was signed by Northwich Victoria in October 2008.

Buxton
A move to Buxton followed in November 2008.

Atherton Collieries
Between September 2008 and February 2009, Ben represented Atherton Collieries, scoring 3 goals in 16 appearances.

Radcliffe Borough
He joined Radcliffe Borough in March 2009, but left in 2013.

Warrington Town
His next club was Warrington Town. His time at the club included being part of the FA Cup victory against Exeter City in November 2014. He left the club in January 2016.

Ashton United
In January 2016 he moved to Ashton United.

Colne
His next move was to Colne

Bamber Bridge
His next move was to Bamber Bridge

Brighouse Town
His next move was to Brighouse Town. He left the club in January 2017.

Droylsden
His next move in July 2017 took him to Droylsden.

Curzon Ashton
In August 2017 he moved to Curzon Ashton.

Radcliffe
He returned to his former club in 2018, remaining for two seasons.  In his two spells with the club he made 263 appearances scoring 87 goals.

Runcorn Linnets
Wharton joined Runcorn Linnets in January 2020

Stalybridge Celtic
In December 2020 he signed for Stalybridge Celtic but never appeared for the club.

Widnes
In July 2021 he signed for Widnes.

Bury AFC
In September he moved to Bury AFC. He was awarded the North West Counties Football League First Division player of the month award for October. On 27 March 2022, Wharton scored the second goal in a 4–0 thrashing of St Helens Town that saw Bury AFC crowned champions of the NWCFL North Division.

Style of play
A lower league write up in 'When Saturday Comes' likened Wharton's appearance and playing style to Iain Dowie.

Honours
Bury AFC
NWCFL Division One North: 2021–22

References

External links

1990 births
Living people
Association football forwards
English footballers
English Football League players
Footballers from Stockport
National League (English football) players
Northern Premier League players
Ashton United F.C. players
Atherton Collieries A.F.C. players
Bamber Bridge F.C. players
Brighouse Town F.C. players
Bury A.F.C. players
Buxton F.C. players
Colne F.C. players
Curzon Ashton F.C. players
Droylsden F.C. players
Mossley A.F.C. players
Northwich Victoria F.C. players
Radcliffe F.C. players
Rochdale A.F.C. players
Runcorn Linnets F.C. players
Stalybridge Celtic F.C. players
Stockport County F.C. players
Warrington Town F.C. players
Widnes F.C. players